"Hora Unirii" is a poem by Vasile Alecsandri, published in 1856. The song is sung and danced especially on January 24, the anniversary of the day in which the Romanian United Principalities were formally united in 1859. It was, in fact, considered the "unofficial anthem" of the unification of the Romanian principalities and its supporters in 1859.

The poem Kënga e bashkimit ("The Song of Unit") of Aleksandër Stavre Drenova, published in 1912, is a clear adaptation of Alecsandri's "Hora Unirii".

Use in TVR 

It was used by TVR for its station sign-off during the "energy saving program" between 1985 to 1989, when its schedule was severely limited to two hours per day.

Text and translation

See also
Hora (dance)

References

External links

 Cum s-a nascut "Hora Unirii"?, 1 June 2007, Adrian Majuru, Ziarul Financiar

Romanian patriotic songs
Romanian poems
1856 songs
Romanian-language songs